John Fergus was an Irish physician and man of letters, c.1700 – c.1761.

Biography

A descendant of the Ó Fearghuis medical family of Connacht, Doctor Fergus a native of County Mayo but moved to Dublin city early in his adult life.

He was a scribe, and book collector, as well as a member of the Ó Neachtáin literary circle in early 18th century Dublin. He amassed a huge library of Irish manuscripts, which included the Liber Flavus Fergusiorum, a medical text created by his ancestors in the 14th century.

Sources

 John Fergus MD: Eighteenth-century Doctor, Book Collector and Irish Scholar, by Diarmaid O Cathain, in Journal of the Royal Society of Antiquaries of Ireland, pp. 139–163, volume 118, 1988.

See also

 Seon Mac Solaidh
 Tadhg Ó Neachtain
 Richard Tipper
 Charles O'Conor (historian)

External links
 https://web.archive.org/web/20120508201733/http://www.ria.ie/Library/Special-Collections/Manuscripts/Liber-Flavus-Fergusiorum.aspx

18th-century Irish writers
18th-century Irish male writers
18th-century Irish medical doctors
Irish scholars and academics
People from County Mayo
Medical doctors from Dublin (city)
Irish scribes
Irish book and manuscript collectors
1700s births
1760s deaths
Irish-language writers